Varanasi Junction railway station (station code: BSB), also known as Varanasi Cantt railway station, is the main railway station serving the city of Varanasi. Deen Dayal Upadhyay Jn. The junction station is sandwiched between the cantonment region and Chetganj region of the city. The station is partially controlled by the Lucknow Division of the Northern Railway Zone and the Varanasi Division of the North Eastern Railway Zone of the Indian Railways. Varanasi Junction railway station nearly reaches the frequency of 300 trains daily. Almost, 45 trains originate and terminate at the station. Premium trains of Indian Railways also originate from Varanasi Junction, such as Vande Bharat Express and Mahamana Express

History
The first line to the temple town was opened from Howrah in 1862. The Chief Engineer of East Indian Railway Company, George Turnbull directed and built the route via Patna. In 1872, a line was added for Lucknow and in 1887, Malviya Bridge was opened to connect the city with Mughalsarai. Also, the bridge connected the Oudh and the Rohilkhand Railway with those of the East India Company at Mughal Sarai.

Infrastructure
The Varanasi Junction railway station has a modern Route Interlock System with an automated signaling system. Varanasi Junction railway station was ranked 14th among 75 busiest A1 category stations on the cleanliness scale. At present, there are 9 platforms while 3 more platforms are being constructed to take off the load. Well, the station is equipped with water ATMs, escalators, Wifi, lifts, and many other public conveniences. Due to heavy inflow of tourists from across the country, the railway administration has planned to add the public announcements in other languages such as Tamil, Malayalam, Kannada, Odia, Marathi, and Telugu.

Modernization
In 2018, the station was included in the list of 90 stations to be converted into world-class hubs. The redevelopment plan will include the induction of CCTV cameras, Wifi, renovation of the station buildings, modular water kiosks, water, ATMs, LED lights, lifts, escalators, stainless steel benches, and modular catering kiosks. Varanasi Junction railway station is also loaded with rooftop solar panels which can generate up to 600 KW and the administration is planning to add another 1000KW.

The upgradation and remodelling of Varanasi junction is being done with a major project of Rs 568.7 crore. A major thrust of the railways is on remodelling of yards, construction of new platforms, beautification, augmentation of passenger amenities such as waiting halls and approach roads. Besides, the modern GRP thana, the expanded building also has a world class waiting lobby, escalators, stairs for a new railway foot over bridge, cafeteria and other passenger amenities.

See also
Banaras railway station
Kashi railway station
Varanasi City railway station
Mughalsarai Junction railway station
Kerakat railway station

References

External links

Railway junction stations in Uttar Pradesh
Railway stations in Varanasi
Lucknow NR railway division
1862 establishments in India
Railway stations opened in 1862